The Ruvyironza (or Luvironza) River is a river in Africa that is considered by some to be the most remote source of the Nile, the world's longest river. It rises on Mount Kikizi in Burundi, and flows over the Rurubu River into the Kagera River in Tanzania, and from there into Lake Victoria.

References 

Nile
Rivers of Burundi
Rivers of Tanzania
International rivers of Africa
Tributaries of Lake Victoria